The Sepon mine is one of the largest gold mines in Laos and in the world. The mine is in Savannakhet Province. The mine has estimated reserves of 7.65 million oz of gold.

References 

Gold mines in Laos